Sophocles is a crater on Mercury. Its name was adopted by the International Astronomical Union in 1976, after the Greek dramatist Sophocles.

Zeami crater is to the north of Sophocles, and Goya is to the west.

References

Impact craters on Mercury